Medusa (minor planet designation: 149 Medusa) is a bright-coloured, stony main-belt asteroid that was discovered by French astronomer J. Perrotin on September 21, 1875, and named after the Gorgon Medusa, a snake-haired monster in Greek mythology. The orbital plane is tilted slightly at an angle of 0.94° to the plane of the ecliptic.

When it was discovered, Medusa was by far the smallest asteroid found (although this was not known at that time). Since then, many thousands of smaller asteroids have been found. It was also the closest asteroid to the Sun discovered up to that point, beating the long-held record of 8 Flora. It remained the closest asteroid to the Sun until 433 Eros and 434 Hungaria were found in 1898, leading to the discovery of two new families of asteroids inward from the 4:1 Kirkwood gap which forms the boundary of the main belt.

Photometric observations of this asteroid at the Organ Mesa Observatory in Las Cruces, New Mexico, during 2010 gave a light curve with a rather long rotation period of 26.038 ± 0.002 hours and a brightness variation of 0.56 ± 0.03 in magnitude.

References

External links 
 
 

000149
Discoveries by Henri Perrotin
Named minor planets
000149
18750921